Gastón Miguel Pisani (born 6 December 1983), is an Argentine football midfielder with Italian citizenship.

Pisani played for several years in the lower leagues of Argentine and Brazilian football before joining Bulgarian club Vihren Sandanski.

In 2009, Pisani returned to Argentina to play for General Lamadrid.

External links
 Gastón Pisani at BDFA.com.ar 

(San Nicola de Sulmona calcio 2011)

Living people
1983 births
Argentine footballers
Argentine expatriate sportspeople in Bulgaria
Olaria Atlético Clube players
Expatriate footballers in Brazil
Expatriate footballers in Bulgaria
First Professional Football League (Bulgaria) players
Association football midfielders
Footballers from Buenos Aires